Anisoptera curtisii is a species of plant in the family Dipterocarpaceae. It is found in Indonesia, Malaysia, and Thailand.

References

curtisii
Critically endangered plants
Taxonomy articles created by Polbot